Bhagya Dile Tu Mala is an Indian Marathi television series. It is produced by Kashmira Pathare under the banner of Virat Entertainment. The show premiered on 4 April 2022 on Colors Marathi. It stars Tanvi Mundle, Vivek Sangle and Nivedita Joshi-Saraf. It is an official remake of Kannada show Kannadathi.

Cast

Main 
 Tanvi Mundle as Kaveri Madhukar Karekar/ Kaveri Rajwardhan Mohite- Rajvardhan's wife.
 Vivek Sangle as Rajwardhan Mohite- Kaveri's husband.
 Nivedita Joshi-Saraf as Ratnamala Mohite- Rajvardhan's Mother.

Recurring 
 Amit Rekhi as Aditya Mohite- Rajvardhan's cousin.
 Janhavi Killekar as Saniya Shripad Dabholkar / Saniya Aditya Mohite- Aditya's wife.
 Sudesh Mhashlikar as Sudarshan Mohite- Aditya's father, Rajvardhan's uncle.
 Nandini Vaidya as Aakanksha Sudarshan Mohite- Aditya's Mother.
 Purva Phadke as Vaidehi Pradhan- Kaveri's friend.
 Bhagyashree Dalvi as Piyu Mohite- Aditya's sister, Rajvardhan's cousin
 Atul Mahajan as Madhukar Karekar- Kaveri's Father.
 Nilesh Ranade as Bacchu- Ratnamala's brother.
 Sayali Jathar as Gauri Karekar- Kaveri's step-sister
 Surabhi Bhave-Damle as Suvarna Shripad Dabholkar- Saniya's mother.
 Yogesh Kelkar as Shripad Dabholkar- Saniya's father.
 Sanjeevani Jadhav as Mangala.
 Sakshi Paranjape as Kaveri's mother.

Reception

Special episode (2 hours) 
 26 February 2023 (Raj-Kaveri's marriage)

References

External links 
 
 Bhagya Dile Tu Mala at Voot

2022 Indian television series debuts
Colors Marathi original programming
Marathi-language television shows